The Thüringer Bachwochen (Thuringia Bach weeks) is a Baroque music festival in honor of Johann Sebastian Bach. It is the largest classical music festival in Thuringia, Germany. The artistic director since 2004 has been the Erfurt Cathedral organist Silvius von Kessel.

History 
In 1992, the Thuringian Bach Festival was held for the first time. After being abandoned, it was revived in 2005. Artists have included Ton Koopman, Olivier Latry, the Cappella Amsterdam, Martin Stadtfeld, Sol Gabetta, the Berlin Baroque Soloists, the Collegium Vocale Gent conducted by Philippe Herreweghe, the Tölzer Knabenchor and the Dresdner Kreuzchor.

Locations 
Bach was born in Thuringia and lived in various places in the province. Venues for events vary from year to year. They have included:

 Arnstadt: Bachkirche Arnstadt
 Dornheim:  where Bach married his first wife.
 Eisenach: , Bach House (Eisenach), Wartburg
 Erfurt: Augustinerkloster, Erfurt Cathedral, Predigerkirche, Theater Erfurt
 Gotha: 
 Jena: 
 Mühlhausen: Marienkirche
 Ohrdruf: 
 Schmalkalden: 
 Waltershausen: 
 Wechmar: Bach House
 Weimar: Deutsches Nationaltheater, St. Peter und Paul, Schloss Weimar

See also
Bach festival
Early music festival

References

External links
Official site

Bach festivals
Classical music festivals in Germany
Festivals in Thuringia
Music festivals established in 1992